Diego Souza or Diego de Souza may refer to:
Diego Souza (footballer, born 1985) (Diego de Souza Andrade), Brazilian footballer
Diego de Souza (footballer, born 1984) (Diego Alejandro de Souza Carballo), Uruguayan footballer
Diego Souza (footballer, born 1984) (Diego de Souza Gama Silva), Brazilian footballer
Diego Souza (footballer, born 1993) (Diego de Souza Xavier), Brazilian footballer
Diego Souza (footballer, born 2002), Brazilian footballer
Dyego Sousa, Portuguese footballer